Georges Christen (born December 21, 1962 in Luxembourg City) is a Luxembourgish strongman. He holds 23 Guinness World Records, including the fastest hot water bottle inflated by lung power. Other records involve tearing up phonebooks, train-towing and plane-pulling.

External links
 Georges Christen official website

1962 births
Living people
Luxembourgian strength athletes
Sportspeople from Luxembourg City